Buttonville is a suburban planned neighbourhood from a former police village in the city of Markham, Ontario, Canada, west of the larger Unionville neighbourhood. the former hamlet and police village named after its founder, John Button.

About 30,000 residents live in the area, which is located along the Woodbine Avenue corridor from approximately Highway 7 in the south to Sixteenth Avenue in the north. The Rouge River is in the northeast and Buttonville Municipal Airport and Highway 404 are in the west, with three interchanges. The residential area is located in the eastern, northeastern, and the northern sections, and the industrial area is to the west and the south down to Highway 7.

The area is home to many technology companies near the airport, which incidentally is the location from which weather reports are taken for Environment and Climate Change Canada by the Department of National Defence. There is talk about renaming the community to the John Button Community after its founder since there has been confusion between Unionville and Buttonville, which is popularly considered to be part of Unionville.

History

The area was first settled by William Berczy who got an original Crown grant of land. The police village in Markham Township was named after John Button (b. 1772) who bought property here in 1808. The area's name first appeared in 1851 when a post office was granted to John Button and William Morrison. The name was chosen instead of Millbrook, which had been unofficially used since 1834. John Button's descendants owned a number of lots in what is today Buttonville. By 1878 the village had a post office, a gristmill, a wagon maker, a school, a Lutheran church and a Methodist church. Buttonville Community Hall was relocated from L'Amoreaux in Scarborough from what was a Methodist chapel c. 1840s and closed in 1938.

Unionville housing developments did not began until the 1960s near Cachet Woods at Woodbine Avenue and Major Mackenzie Drive, and the industrial area began to appear further south. In the 1980s housing developments came to the western part of Markham along with the industries which later flowed with technological and financial companies including Allstate. Buttonville was first accessed when Highway 404 opened several interchanges in the 1970s. Between 1994 and 1996, more houses continued northeast of Buttonville and a few years later, north of the airport and more housing continued until 2004.

Geography
Population:
1990: about 10,000
2002: about 30,000

Farmlands formerly surrounded Buttonville and between 1980 and 2000, the farmlands were developed. Forests were also found around Buttonville, especially to its south. .

Climate

Transportation

 Buttonville Municipal Airport is located at 16th Avenue and Highway 404

Public transit in Buttonville is served by:

 York Region Transit / Viva Rapid Transit routes Viva Purple, 1 Highway 7 (both serving Highway 7), 85 Rutherford-16th (Sixteenth), and 24 Woodbine (Woodbine) operate regular bus service.

The neighbourhood is served by one major highways and several arterial roads:

 Highway 404 runs north–south on the west side of and connected to east-south streets
 Highway 7 runs east–west on the south side.
 Sixteenth Avenue runs east–west on the north side.
 Woodbine Avenue runs north–south through its centre. The historic settlement is located along it south of Sixteenth Avenue.

Nearest communities
Richmond Hill, west
Unionville, east
Milliken, south
Stouffville, north

Education

 Buttonville PS
 YRDSB Museum and Archives housed in 1850 Buttonville Schoolhouse

References

Neighbourhoods in Markham, Ontario